Mink Lake may refer to:

Lakes
Big Mink Lake, Ontario, Canada
Little Mink Lake (Lennox and Addington County), Ontario, Canada
Mink Lake (Lane County, Oregon), United States
Mink Lake (Teton County, Wyoming), Grand Teton National Park, United States

Settlements
Mink Lake, Nipissing District, Ontario, Canada